is the fourth studio album by Chara, which was released on October 10, 1994. It debuted at #4 on the Japanese Oricon album charts, and charted in the top 200 for 7 weeks. It eventually sold 145,000 copies.

Tsumibukaku Aishite yo, despite not having any tie-up like her former popular singles, reached #55 on the singles charts and sold more than these singles. Atashi Nande Dakishimetai n darou? was used in commercials for the Toyota Starlet car. This single sold app. 38,000 copies, and has since become one of her signature songs.

Track listing

Note: translations are official translations, as written in the album booklet. More accurate translations are listed in brackets.

Singles

Japan Sales Rankings

References
 	

Chara (singer) albums
1994 albums